The NC State Athletic Hall of Fame is a sports history museum located in Reynolds Coliseum in Raleigh, North Carolina, U.S.  The museum pays tribute to the most legendary and influential NC State Wolfpack sports heroes. Although the inaugural class of inductees were announced in 2012 the museum area opened in October 2016

Exhibits 
The NC State Athletic Hall of Fame is home to many major trophies and awards. Exhibits highlight the history and significance of famous Wolfpack players, coaches, and teams. Special exhibits are on display for the most recent inductees.

Inductees
Athletes:

Joan Benoit, Women's Cross Country and Track and Field, ‘18 
Genia Beasley, Women's Basketball, ‘12
Ted Brown, Football, ‘12
Thori Staples Bryan, Women's Soccer, ‘20
Tommy Burleson, Basketball, ‘13
Dennis Byrd, Football, ‘14
Mike Caldwell, Baseball, ‘13
Dick Christy, Football, ‘16
Tim Clark, Men's Golf, ‘18
Stan Cockerton, Men's Lacrosse, ‘20
Richard Dickey, Men's Basketball, ‘14
David Fox, Men's Swimming and Diving, ‘20
Roman Gabriel, Football, ‘12 
Betty Jo Geiger, Cross Country and Track and Field, ‘13
Steve Gregg, Swimming and Diving, ‘13
Henry Gutierrez, Men's Soccer, ‘20
Irwin Holmes, Men's Tennis and Track and Field, ‘20
Torry Holt, Football, ‘13
Charmaine Hooper, Women's Soccer, ‘14
Cullen Jones, Men's Swimming and Diving, ‘18
Trudi Lacey, Women's Basketball, ‘18
Jack McDowall, Football, Baseball, Men's Basketball, Track and Field, ‘14
Chasity Melvin, Women's Basketball, ‘14
Rodney Monroe, Men's Basketball, ‘18
Linda Page, Women's Basketball, ‘16
Danny Peebles, Football, Track and Field, ‘14
Lou Pucillo, Men's Basketball, ‘14
Tab Ramos, Men's Soccer, ‘12
Stephen Rerych, Men's Swimming and Diving, ‘14
Jim Ritcher, Football, ‘12
Philip Rivers, Football, ‘13
Dave Robertson , Football, Baseball, Men's Basketball, Track and Field, ‘16
John Sadri, Men's Tennis, ‘20
Ronnie Shavlik, Men's Basketball, ‘13
Julie Shea, Track and Field and Cross Country, ‘12
Andrea Stinson, Women's Basketball, ‘13
Sylvester Terkay, Wrestling, ‘13
David Thompson, Basketball, ‘12
Mario Williams, Football, ‘20

Coaches:

Everett Case, Men's Basketball, ‘12
Willis Casey, Men's Swimming and Diving, ‘18
Don Easterling, Swimming and Diving, ‘16
Earle Edwards, Football, ‘13
Sammy Esposito, Baseball, ‘14
Norm Sloan, Men's Basketball, ‘13
Jim Valvano, Men's Basketball, ‘12
Kay Yow, Women's Basketball, ‘12

Teams:

1974 Men's Basketball Team, ‘16
1983 Men's Basketball Team, ‘18

Special Contributor:

Wendell Murphy, ‘14

References

External links 
NC State Athletic Hall of Fame Official Website 
NC State Athletic Hall of Fame (on Google Maps)

Sports museums in North Carolina
University museums in North Carolina
Museums in Raleigh, North Carolina
North Carolina
Halls of fame in North Carolina
Awards established in 2012